Masiri (also Romanized as Maşīrī and Masīrī) is a city and capital of Rostam County, Fars Province, Iran.  At the 2006 census, its population was 5,365, in 1,178 families.

References

Populated places in Rostam County

Cities in Fars Province